The Reverend Samuel Whiting Jr. (March 25, 1633 – February 28, 1713) was the first minister of Billerica, Massachusetts, from November 11, 1663, to February 28, 1713.

Biography
He was the son of the Reverend Samuel Whiting and his second wife, Elizabeth St. John. Elizabeth belonged to the prominent landowning family of St. John of Lydiard Tregoze; she was the sister of Oliver St. John, a leading lawyer and judge who was one of the foremost opponents of King Charles I of England during the English Civil War.

When the elder Reverend Samuel Whiting arrived from King's Lynn England in 1637, the residents of Lynn, Massachusetts changed the name of their settlement in his honor.

Samuel Whiting Jr. graduated from Harvard in 1653. While some sources indicate he had a brother, Nathaniel, this is in error.  In his father's memoir it is clear he had no son named Nathaniel.

References

Further reading
 “Elegy on the Rev. Samuel Whiting,[ Sr.,] of Lynn,” by Benjamin Tompson, “ye renowned poet of New England,” printed in Cotton Mather's Magnalia
 William Whiting, LL. D., Memoirs of Rev. Samuel Whiting and of his Wife, Elizabeth St. John, with Reference to some of their English Ancestors and American Descendants (printed privately, Boston, 1871)

People from Billerica, Massachusetts
1633 births
1713 deaths
Harvard University alumni